The Monza Rally Show (previously known as Rally di Monza or Rally dell'Autodromo) is a motoring event that has been held since 1978 at the Autodromo Nazionale di Monza, where rally and track racing experts compete, as well as protagonists of the entertainment world and other sports. It usually takes place in the last weeks of November, at the end of the competitive season.

On 9 October 2020, it was announced that Rally Monza would be the final round of the 2020 World Rally Championship season, staging a round of the FIA World Rally Championship for the first time. The event was included in the 2021 World Rally Championship as the last round of the season.

History
The first editions featured a mixed surface, with special stages run both on the paved track and on dirt roads carved in the circuit inland areas. 
From 1985 onwards the rally became an all-tarmac event. 
During the 80's and 90's the organizers usually allowed a class for special racing cars, such as touring cars, grand tourers and specially prepared rally cars.
In the following years the event gradually changed from a classical rally to a challenge between rally and track racing drivers, as well as characters from the entertainment world and other sports. Since 2003 the name was changed to Monza Rally Show. In 2020 the event was renamed Rally Monza as it became an official World Rally Championship round including stages inside the circuit and public stages north of Bergamo. The event was again included in the 2021 World Rally Championship, as the final round of the season.

Editions
Complete results.

Multiple winners

See also
 Rallying in Italy

References

External links
 Official website
 Official website (2020 and 2021)
 Monza Rally at eWRC-results

 
Rally competitions in Italy
Sport in Lombardy
Sport in Monza
World Rally Championship rallies
Recurring sporting events established in 1978